Burt Sansom (14 December 1887 – 9 March 1961) was a British wrestler. He competed in the men's freestyle bantamweight at the 1908 Summer Olympics.

References

External links
 

1887 births
1961 deaths
British male sport wrestlers
Olympic wrestlers of Great Britain
Wrestlers at the 1908 Summer Olympics
Sportspeople from London